Tawasentha Hill is a mountain in Barnstable County, Massachusetts. It is located west-southwest of Orleans in the Town of Eastham. Robbins Hill is located west of Tawasentha Hill.

References

Mountains of Massachusetts
Mountains of Barnstable County, Massachusetts